Yethonat is an unincorporated community in Yakima County, Washington, United States. The community developed along the Toppenish, Simcoe and Western Railway Company line. Yethonat is located between Wapato and Toppenish off U.S. Route 97 and is a small, rural agricultural community.

References

Northern Pacific Railway
Unincorporated communities in Yakima County, Washington
Unincorporated communities in Washington (state)